Shem Tov ben Isaac Ardutiel (also Shem Tov ibn Isaac Ardutiel or Santob de Carrión) (c. 1290 – c. 1369) a 14th century Spanish Jew, Hebrew writer and a translator of Arabic texts. His best known works include .

References 

Spanish Jews
Spanish writers
1290 births
1369 deaths